Miljan Begović (born 19 May 1964) is a Croatian former competitive figure skater. He represented Yugoslavia at the 1984 Winter Olympics in Sarajevo and finished 21st. Begović was also selected for six World Championships (best result: 16th in 1983) and five European Championships (best result: 14th in 1983 and 1984). He won a bronze medal at the 1982 Golden Spin of Zagreb.

Competitive highlights

References 

1964 births
Yugoslav male single skaters
Croatian male single skaters
Living people
Figure skaters at the 1984 Winter Olympics
Olympic figure skaters of Yugoslavia
Sportspeople from Zagreb